Following is a list of senators of Meurthe-et-Moselle, people who have represented the department of Meurthe-et-Moselle in the Senate of France.

Third Republic

Senators for Meurthe-et-Moselle under the French Third Republic were:

 Auguste Bernard (1876–1883)
 Henri Varroy (1876–18830
 Albert Berlet (1883–1886)
 Henri Marquis (1883–1906)
 François Volland (1886–1900)
 Alfred Mézières (1900–1915)
 Hippolyte Langlois (1906–1912)
 Gustave Chapuis (1911–1920)
 Ferdinand de Langenhagen (1912–1917)
 Albert François Lebrun (1920–1932) Resigned, elected president of France
 Henri Michaut (1920–1933)
 Louis Michel (1920–1936)
 Gaston Rogé (1933–1941)
 François de Wendel (1933–1941)
 Charles-Henri Cournault (1934–1941)

Fourth Republic

Senators for Meurthe-et-Moselle under the French Fourth Republic were:

 Émile Fournier (1946–1948)
 Georges Lacaze (1946–19480
 Robert Gravier (1946–1959)
 Jean Lionel-Pèlerin (1948–1952)
 Max Mathieu (1948–1952)
 Raymond Pinchard (1952–1959)
 François Valentin (1956–1958)
 Pierre de Boissonneaux de Chevigny (1952–1956)

Fifth Republic 
Senators for Meurthe-et-Moselle under the French Fifth Republic were:

 Raymond Pinchard (1959–1961)
 Pierre de Boissonneaux de Chevigny (1959–1974)
 Robert Gravier (1959–1974)
 Joseph de Pommery (1961–1965)
 Marcel Martin (1965–1974)
 Roger Boileau (1974–1992)
 Hubert Martin (1974–1992)
 Richard Pouille (1974–1992)
 Claude Huriet (1983–2001)
 Jean Bernadaux (1992–2001)
 Jacques Baudot (1992–2007)
 Jacqueline Panis (2007–2011)
 Évelyne Didier (2001–2017)
 Daniel Reiner (2001–2017)

As of January 2018 the senators were:

References

Sources

 
Lists of members of the Senate (France) by department